Simultaneity may refer to:

 Relativity of simultaneity, a concept in special relativity.
 Simultaneity (music), more than one complete musical texture occurring at the same time, rather than in succession
 Simultaneity, a concept in Endogeneity

See also
Non-simultaneity
Diversity factor, or simultaneity factor
Time Structured Mapping